August Ahlin (born 6 April 1997) is a Swedish football goalkeeper who plays for IK Sirius.

References

1997 births
Living people
Swedish footballers
Association football goalkeepers
Boo FK players
Gamla Upsala SK players
IK Sirius Fotboll players
Allsvenskan players